Polydesmiola is a genus of moths that belongs to the family Erebidae. The genus was described by Embrik Strand in 1916.

Species
Polydesmiola cochlearifer (Hulstaert, 1924) Kai Islands
Polydesmiola gothica (Bethune-Baker, 1908) New Guinea
Polydesmiola hebraica (Snellen, 1880) Sulawesi
Polydesmiola holzi (Pagenstecher, 1884) Ambon Island
Polydesmiola meekii (Lucas, 1894) Australia
Polydesmiola niepelti Strand, 1916 Solomon Islands

References

Calpinae
Noctuoidea genera